B.C. II: Grog's Revenge is a 1984 video game by Sydney Development for the Commodore 64, ColecoVision, Coleco ADAM, and MSX. It is the sequel to B.C.'s Quest For Tires and is based on B.C., the newspaper comic strip by Johnny Hart. The game was advertised for the Atari 8-bit, ZX Spectrum, BBC Micro, and Amstrad CPC, but those ports were never released.

Plot
Thor, a caveman, who rides a stone unicycle, is searching for the "meaning of life" within several mountains.

Gameplay
The player must navigate Thor through the mountains, collecting clams. Like the comic strip, clams are used as money.  The object of the game is to collect enough clams to pay a toll to another caveman, Peter, which will allow Thor to access the next mountain.

The player moves Thor along the mountainside and through caves.  When on the mountainside, Thor can move in all four directions, but must avoid falling off the cliff, slamming into a wall, or hitting a rock or hole; he must also avoid encountering a green dinosaur that will eat his "tire" and Grog, who will knock Thor off the mountain by shouting "GROG".  When in a cave, Thor may move from side to side, avoiding stalagmites.  Caves are dark except for a beam of light emanating from the player's position.  If the player collects enough clams before arriving at the end of the mountain trail, he proceeds to the next mountain; otherwise, he must return to collect more clams.

Ports
The Commodore 64 and Coleco ADAM versions has 15 stages (5 per set). The MSX and ColecoVision versions only has 5 stages.

Due to a programming error, none of the MSX releases can be completed. The same goes for the ColecoVision version, although the bug was fixed for the Coleco Canada release. This bug was fixed by Félix Espina, a programmer from Spain in 2019.

Reception
Zzap!64 gave the game a 91% rating, describing it as a "stunningly impressive programme". Computer and Video Games rated the ColecoVision version 87% in 1989.

In a retrospective feature from 1994 on old video games, Commodore Format said Grog's Revenge was "definitely a game of the old school" but remained "a fun little diversion." They rated it 70%.

References

External links

Game of the Week: B.C. II: Grog's Revenge

1984 video games
Sierra Entertainment games
ColecoVision games
Commodore 64 games
MSX games
U.S. Gold games
ZX Spectrum games
Video games based on comics
Video game sequels
Prehistoric people in popular culture
Video games developed in Canada
Video games set in prehistory
Single-player video games
Sydney Development Corporation games